Brajalalchak is a village, in HaldiaCD Block in Haldia subdivision of Purba Medinipur district in the state of West Bengal, India. It is located on NH-41 and marks the entry to Haldia.

Demographics
As per 2011 Census of India Brajalalchak had a total population of 6,366 of which 3,311 (52%) were males and 3,055 (48%) were females. Population below 6 years was 779. The total number of literates in Brajalalchak was 4,875 (87.26% of the population over 6 years).

Transport
SH 4 connecting Jhalda (in Purulia district) and Digha (in Purba Medinipur district) passes through Brajalalchak.

References

Villages in Purba Medinipur district